Listeria booriae is a  Gram-positive, facultatively anaerobic, nonmotile, non-spore-forming rod-shaped species of bacteria. It is not pathogenic and nonhemolytic. It was discovered in a dairy processing plant in the Northeastern United States, and was first described in 2015. The species name honors  "Kathryn Boor, a United States food scientist, for her contribution to the understanding of the biology of Listeria."

References

External links
Type strain of Listeria booriae at BacDive -  the Bacterial Diversity Metadatabase

booriae
Bacteria described in 2015